Giv'ot Bar (lit. Grain Hills) is a community settlement in the northern Negev desert of southern Israel. Located to the south of Rahat, it falls under the jurisdiction of Bnei Shimon Regional Council.

History
The village was established in 2004. Initially there were problems with acquiring the land from the Bedouins living in the area, but in 2004 mobile homes were moved onto the site. The village's name was given to it due to the wheat silos in the surrounding farms and the fact that it was located in a hilly area.

References

External links
Official website

Community settlements
Populated places established in 2004
Populated places in Southern District (Israel)
2004 establishments in Israel